Kix (sometimes stylized as KIX) is an American glam metal and hard rock band that achieved popularity during the 1980s. Led by frontman Steve Whiteman and bassist Donnie Purnell, the band's classic lineup was rounded out by drummer Jimmy "Chocolate" Chalfant and guitarists Ronnie "10/10" Younkins and Brian "Damage" Forsythe. Kix covered AC/DC, Aerosmith, April Wine, Led Zeppelin, and others before signing with Atlantic Records in 1981. Since peaking in the late-1980s, band members have continued to intermittently record and tour, including the Rocklahoma festival in 2008 in Oklahoma. In addition, they are a consistent presence at the annual M3 Rock Festival in the band's home state of Maryland.

History

Early years (1977–1987)
Initially calling themselves Shooze, followed by a stint as The Generators, Kix formed with Ronnie "10/10" Younkins and Donnie Purnell in December 1977 in Hagerstown, Maryland, and Frederick, Maryland. Guitarist Brian "Damage" Forsythe, frontman Steve Whiteman, and drummer Jimmy "Chocolate" Chalfant soon came on board, completing what would become the band's classic lineup.  The band got a contract with Time Warner affiliate Atlantic Records. In 1981, they released their self-titled debut album, Kix, which featured favorites from their live shows like "Atomic Bombs," "The Itch," and "Yeah, Yeah, Yeah." With a unique ad-lib performance by lead vocalist Whiteman, the latter became one of the band's most popular concert songs. Another track, "Love at First Sight," also became a concert favorite.  The album established the tongue-in-cheek rock and roll style of Kix.

Their 1983 follow-up, Cool Kids, showcased a more commercial side of the band and included three cover songs. Spearheaded by the single "Body Talk", a cover of a 1981 Nick Gilder song, rumors circulated that the song was covered to appease the band's label, who was eager to capture radio airplay. Other songs like "Restless Blood" and "Mighty Mouth" fared a little better.  This album was also the only Kix record to feature guitarist Brad Divens, who replaced Younkins for what would ultimately be a brief departure.

Eager to recapture the harder rock vibe of their earlier work, and with Younkins having returned to the line-up, Kix partnered with then Ratt and future Warrant producer Beau Hill and hit songwriter Bob Halligan Jr., releasing Midnite Dynamite in 1985. The album spawned two singles: "Midnite Dynamite" reached No. 18, followed by "Cold Shower," which reached No. 23, both on the Hot Mainstream Rock chart.  Other notable tracks receiving airplay included "Sex" and "Bang Bang (Balls of Fire)".

Commercial success (1988–1995)

After Midnite Dynamite, Kix went back into the studio to record their follow-up. In 1988, they released Blow My Fuse, which went platinum. The Bob Halligan Jr. co-written power ballad "Don't Close Your Eyes" peaked at No. 11 on the Billboard Hot 100. The album also featured the singles "Cold Blood" (the first of Purnell's many co-writes with Taylor Rhodes) and the title track, "Blow My Fuse", along with videos showing the band in concert at Hammerjack's. In 1989, the band released Blow My Fuse: The Videos, featuring their official video releases and behind-the-scenes footage. The success of Blow My Fuse enabled the band to begin performing in arenas.

The album Hot Wire arrived in 1991, with the single "Girl Money". In 1993, guitarist Jimi K. Bones replaced Brian "Damage" Forsythe. While on tour in 1992, they made a live album, titled Live, showcasing a recent performance at the University of Maryland, College Park. This album, internally referred to as Contractual Obligation Live, was released in 1993. In 1994, Atlantic dropped the band from the label. In 1995, the band released their next album, $how Bu$ine$$, on CMC International.

Side projects
In 1996, Whiteman formed a band called Funny Money. In 1998, Brian "Damage" Forsythe teamed up with ex-White Sister and Tattoo Rodeo drummer Rich Wright, and erstwhile Rhino Bucket members rhythm guitarist/lead vocalist Georg Dolivo (George Dolivo) and bassist Reeve Downes to forge Deep Six Holiday.  In 2001, Forsythe himself would join Rhino Bucket, later performing lead guitar on the group's 2005 release And Then It Got Ugly..

Meanwhile, Ronnie "10/10" Younkins relocated to Baltimore City, and would be part of the rock 'n' roll act Jeremy and the Suicides. Younkins later moved to L.A., then wrote, recorded, and released the album The Slimmer Twins: Lack of Luxury, as a collaboration with vocalist Jeremy L. White in 2000. Back on the East Coast, he founded the Blues Vultures in 2002, maturing into the lead vocalist and primary songwriter, and in 2005, released the album The Blues Vultures: Cheap Guitars & Honky Tonk Bars. 

Jimmy "Chocolate" Chalfant joined Whiteman in Funny Money as their drummer in 2003, ultimately sowing the seeds for a Kix reunion.

Reunion (2003–present)
Kix reformed in late 2003 without songwriter and band leader Donnie Purnell. Kix then lined-up shows for September 2004, the line-up consisting of Whiteman (lead vocals), Younkins (guitars), Brian "Damage" Forsythe (guitars), Jimmy "Chocolate" Chalfant (drums, backing vocals), and Funny Money bassist/vocalist/songwriter Mark Schenker in place of Donnie Purnell.

On August 7, 2012, Frontiers Records announced that it had signed Kix; the band subsequently released a live CD/DVD, titled Live in Baltimore, in September, with a new studio album to follow in 2013.

On April 16, 2014, it was announced that the band had signed with Loud & Proud Records to release the band's first studio album in 19 years.  On June 18, 2014, it was announced that the band would release this album - their seventh studio album - titled Rock Your Face Off, on August 5.  Upon release, it debuted at No. 49 on the Billboard Top 200 (the band's second highest-charting record after 1988's Blow My Fuse), while debuting at No. 1 on Amazon Hard Rock, remaining there for more than three weeks. It was well-received by fans and critics alike. The hard rock webzine Sleaze Roxx published that Rock Your Face Off was awarded No. 1 in the Top Ten Albums of 2014 by editors and staff as well as No. 1 in Top Ten Albums of 2014 in the Sleaze Roxx Reader's Poll. The first time in the web site's history that an album has taken the top spot in both categories. Stereogum.com chose Rock Your Face Off as Album of the Week with high praise saying "...all of it is delirious and catchy, and it proudly flaunts its out-of-fashion party-hard spirit. It’s glittering trash, made by guys in their fifties who probably hold down day jobs these days and who have no business making this vigorous and fun anymore. Its mere existence is an inspirational thing, and it’s a reminder that sometimes exploring new musical space isn’t the most important thing. Sometimes, songs are the most important thing."

In February 2017, it was announced that Kix would headline the first night at Rockingham Festival 2017, which was held at Nottingham Trent University, United Kingdom.

Original Shooze drummer Donnie Spence died at the age of 64 on January 19, 2018 in Hagerstown, Maryland.

On September 21, 2018 a 2 CD anniversary edition set named Fuse 30 Reblown – 30th Anniversary Special Edition has been published. Producer Beau Hill who previously worked with Kix on their 1985 album, Midnite Dynamite remixed the original 24 track recordings. Fuse 30 Reblown is the original concept of current guitarist Schenker, who with help from record executive Madelyn Scarpulla, was able to obtain digital transfers from the original analog master recording reels. Schenker was also instrumental in rescuing the original 8-track demo reels and to digitally enhance and rescue the original 2-track demos. The website Metalnation.com reported "Hill does a masterful job on Fuse 30, bringing the album into the new millennium without taking away from eclectic elements and raucous energy that made the original so memorable. Jay Frigoletto came in to master the album. The second disc contains the 10 demo recordings for each one of the album tracks." In 2020 the previous album Midnight Dynamite was remixed and re-released. It's called Midnight Dynamite Re-Lit, only available as a digital download.

In May 2021, it was announced guitarist Ronnie Younkins would be unable to perform with the band for the foreseeable future and was temporarily replaced by Bob Paré for upcoming live shows. A month later, it was revealed that the reason for Younkins' absence was because he had been placed under house arrest after repeatedly getting in trouble with the police.

In late February 2022, Ronnie returned to live performances with Kix.

On November 18, 2022, drummer Jimmy Chalfant suffered an apparent severe cardiac event while on stage at the Tally Ho Theater in Leesburg, Va.

More recent side projects
In 2018, bassist Mark Schenker formed the Rush tribute band Sun Dogs handling lead vocals, bass, keyboards and bass pedals.

In other media 
The 2017 horror comedy Dead Ant covers songs by Kix, presented as songs by Sonic Grave, a fictional has-been glam metal band.

Band members
Current members
 Ronnie "10/10" Younkins – guitar, talk box, occasional backing vocals (1977–1982, 1983–1996, 2003–present; non touring 2021–present)
 Brian "Damage" Forsythe – guitar, lead vocals (1977–1978); guitar, guitar synthesizer, occasional backing vocals (1978–1993, 1994–1995); guitar, guitar synthesizer, occasional backing vocals, keyboards (2003–present)
 Steve Whiteman – lead and backing vocals, drums, percussion (1978–1979); lead vocals, harmonica, percussion, saxophone, acoustic guitar (1979–1996, 2003–present)
 Jimmy "Chocolate" Chalfant – drums, percussion, backing vocals, effects (1978–1996, 2003–present; non touring 2023–present)
 Mark Schenker – bass, backing vocals (2003–present)

Current touring substitutes
 Bob Paré – guitar, backing vocals (2021–present)
 Matt Starr – drums, percussion, backing vocals (2023–present)

Former members
 Donnie Purnell – bass, lead and backing vocals (1977–1978); bass, keyboards, piano, backing vocals, acoustic guitar (1978–1996)
 Tee – lead vocals (1977–1978)
 Tunes – guitar (1977–1978)
 Donnie Spence – drums, percussion, lead and backing vocals (1977–1978); drums, percussion, backing and lead vocals (1978–1979); drums, percussion, backing vocals (1979–1980)
 Terry Brady – lead vocals (1978)
 Sam Smith – lead vocals (1978)
 David "Stargazer" Bumbalough – guitar (1978–1980)
 Brad Divens – guitar, backing vocals, talk box (1982–1984)

Former touring substitutes
 Jimi K. Bones – guitar (1989, 1992, 1993–1994; touring guest 2016)
 Roger Studner – guitar (1995)
 Pat DeMent – guitar (1995–1996)
 Aaron Isaacs – drums, percussion, backing vocals (2008)
 Ned Meloni – guitar (2019)
 Will Hunt – drums, percussion (2021)
 Vince Tricarico – drums, percussion (2021)
 John Allen – drums, percussion, backing vocals (2021)

Session members
 Anton Fig – drums, percussion on "Lie Like a Rug" and "Sex" from Midnite Dynamite (1985)
 Mike Slamer – guitar on "Walkin' Away" and "Scarlet Fever" from Midnite Dynamite (1985)
 Kip Winger – backing vocals on "Bang Bang (Balls of Fire)" from Midnite Dynamite (1985)
 John Luce – backing vocals on "Bang Bang (Balls of Fire)" from Midnite Dynamite (1985)
 Beau Hill – keyboards, guitar on Midnite Dynamite (1985)
 Paul Chalfant – viola on "If You Run Around" from Show Business (1995)

Touring guests
 Jani Lane – vocals (2010)
 Avery Molek – drums (2021)

Timeline

Discography and videography

Studio albums

Live albums
Live (1993)
Live in Baltimore (2012)

Compilation albums
The Essentials (2002)
Thunderground (2004) (unofficial bootleg of demos)
Rhino Hi-Five EP (2006)

Guest appearances
Monster Metal Power Ballads (2006 — track "Still Loving You" (Scorpions cover), credited as "Still Lovin' You" by Steve Whitman)
Monster Ballads: Platinum Edition (2006, retail version — track "Don't Close Your Eyes")
Monster Ballads: Platinum Edition (2005, exclusive version — track "Don't Close Your Eyes")
Leppardmania: A Tribute to Def Leppard (2000 — track "Foolin'" (Def Leppard cover), credited as "Foolin'" by Steve Whiteman)
Monster Ballads (1999 — track "Don't Close Your Eyes")

Singles

Videos
Blow My Fuse: The Videos (1989)

References

External links

In-depth 2014 interview with Kix guitarist Brian Forsythe on Guitar.com
2008 Ronnie Younkins Interview at Sleaze Roxx

1977 establishments in Maryland
1996 disestablishments in Maryland
Atlantic Records artists
Glam metal musical groups from Maryland
Hard rock musical groups from Maryland
Heavy metal musical groups from Maryland
Musical groups established in 1977
Musical groups disestablished in 1996
Musical groups reestablished in 2003